"Das Mahrchen von der Padde" ("The Tale of the Toad") is a German folktale collected by Johann Gustav Gottlieb Büsching in Volks-Sagen, Märchen und Legenden (1812). It has been translated into English under the titles of "Puddocky" or "Cherry the Frog Bride".

A similar tale is The Three Feathers, collected by the Brothers Grimm in the nineteenth century.

Synopsis
The story opens with the heroine, who is so greedy for parsley that her mother steals it for her. As a result, she is called Parsley. The parsley comes from the garden of a neighboring convent run by an abbess. The girl is seen by three princes, and because of her beauty, they quarrel over her. The resentful abbess curses the girl for the commotion, turning her into a toad and sending her far away.. 

The king decides to allow fate to choose his successor from among his three sons. He sets them the task of finding a hundred-yard piece of linen fine enough to fit through a ring. While the two oldest princes choose to follow busier roads and collect bales of linen, the youngest son sets out on a dark and lonely road. He comes into a marsh, where he encounters a toad which offers him the fabric he needs. It exceeds his brothers' discoveries.  The king then sends them out to find a dog that can fit inside a walnut shell.  Again, the toad provides.

For the third task, the king orders them to return with a bride. The one who obtains the most beautiful wife will be king. This time, the toad herself accompanies the youngest prince, riding in a cardboard carriage drawn by rats, with hedgehogs for outriders, a mouse for a coachman, and two frogs as footmen. When they turn a corner, the prince is astonished to see the carriage replaced by a beautiful coach with human attendants, and that the toad has become a beautiful woman whom he recognizes as Parsley. He is selected as the new king, and marries Parsley.

Variants 
This story is closely related to The Frog Princess, wherein a transformed frog, the bride of the youngest son, performs better at three tasks to test the brides than the other sons' human brides.

Edgar Taylor translated the tale as "Cherry, or the Frog-Bride", changing both the desired plant and the girl's name to Cherry, and grouped it with tales by the Brothers Grimm. This translation was slightly revised and altered by Marian Edwardes and included as "Cherry the Frog-Bride" in Grimm's Household Tales (1912). In a very similar Grimm tale, The Three Feathers, there is no scene of garden theft, and the frog's origin is never explained.

Andrew Lang translated the tale under the title of "Puddocky". In Lang's version, the owner of the parsley garden is a witch who demands that the girl be handed over to her, as in Rapunzel.

A Hungarian variant, Ribike, shows the titular Ribike also obsessed with her favourite type of fruit, and later she helps the prince in lizard form.

"The White Cat" is a literary version of the tale written by Madame d'Aulnoy in 1697, featuring cats instead of frogs.

Gail Carson Levine adapted this story in her children's book For Biddle's Sake.

See also

Doll i' the Grass
The Frog Prince (story)
Prunella (fairy tale)
Rapunzel
The Three Feathers (German fairy tale by the Brothers Grimm)
The White Cat (fairy tale)

References

External links 

 Puddocky from The Green Fairy Book
 Cherry, or the Frog bride version from the Grimm Brothers

Grimms' Fairy Tales
German fairy tales
Fictional frogs
Fiction about shapeshifting
Witchcraft in fairy tales
Animal tales
ATU 400-459